Vagner do Carmo Mancini (born 24 October 1966) is a Brazilian professional football coach and former player who is in charge of Brazilian Série A club América Mineiro.

Playing career
Born in Ribeirão Preto, São Paulo, Mancini started his career with Guarani in 1988. He subsequently went on to represent Portuguesa, Bragantino and Botafogo-SP before joining Grêmio in 1995.

Mancini featured sparingly for the club during the season, being crowned champions of 1995 Copa Libertadores but losing the 1995 Copa do Brasil to Corinthians; he was sent off in the first leg of the latter competition's final. Subsequently, he went on to play for São José-SP, Coritiba, Ponte Preta, Sãocarlense, Ceará, Figueirense, Sport, Ituano and Paulista, retiring with the latter in 2004 at the age of 37.

In 1999, while injured at Sãocarlense, Mancini took over as an interim coach for ten days.

Coaching career
In May 2004, while still actively playing for Paulista, Mancini opted to retire after receiving a coaching offer. He was crowned champions of the 2005 Copa do Brasil with the side before accepting an offer from Al Nasr SC in April 2007.

On 10 December 2007, Mancini returned to Brazil after being appointed head coach of former club Grêmio. He was sacked the following 14 February, despite being unbeaten, and was named Vitória head coach on 25 March.

On 15 February 2009, Mancini left Vitória and was announced as head coach of Santos. Relieved from his duties on 13 July, he returned to Vitória on 12 August.

On 11 December 2009, Mancini was appointed head coach of Vasco da Gama, but was dismissed on 25 March of the following year. On 15 April 2010 he was presented at another club he represented as a player, Guarani, but after failing to avoid relegation, he resigned on 5 December.

On 26 September 2011, after a short stint at Ceará, Mancini was appointed as new head coach of Cruzeiro. The following 10 May, he resigned after being knocked out of two competitions in the same week.

On 15 May 2012, Mancini signed with Sport (another club he represented as a player) until the end of the year. He was sacked on 11 August, and joined Náutico the following 1 February.

Dismissed on 8 April 2013, Mancini was appointed at the helm of Atlético Paranaense on 10 July, with the club in the relegation places. He managed to reach the finals of the 2013 Copa do Brasil, while also finishing third in the league; his contract, nonetheless, was not renewed.

After two consecutive relegations with Botafogo and Vitória, Mancini was appointed as new head coach of Chapecoense on 9 December 2016. He was relieved from his duties on 4 July 2017, after a 3–3 draw against Fluminense.

On 25 July 2017, Mancini returned to Vitória for a fourth stint, and managed to narrowly avoid relegation at the end of the season. On 29 July of the following year, after a 4–0 loss at Atlético Paranaense, he was dismissed.

On 2 January 2019, Mancini joined São Paulo FC as the club's technical coordinator. On 14 February, he was named interim coach after the club announced a deal with Cuca, out due to health problems; in April, as Cuca was given the green light to manage, he returned to his previous role.

On 14 October 2019, after leaving São Paulo, Mancini was appointed head coach of Atlético Mineiro until the end of the season, and left the club after four wins in 13 matches. On 25 June 2020, he replaced dismissed Cristóvão Borges at the helm of fellow top tier side Atlético Goianiense.

On 12 October 2020, Mancini was appointed head coach of Corinthians, signing a contract until the end of 2021. On 16 May of the following year, after being knocked out of the 2021 Campeonato Paulista, he was sacked.

On 19 June 2021, Mancini was appointed head coach of another top tier side, América Mineiro. He resigned on 14 October, and was named at the helm of Grêmio for a second spell just hours later.

Mancini was unable to avoid Grêmio's relegation, and was subsequently sacked on 14 February 2022. On 12 April, he returned to América in the place of Marquinhos Santos.

Personal life
Mancini's son Matheus is also a footballer. A centre back, he plays for Confiança.

Coaching statistics

Honours

Player
Grêmio
 Campeonato Gaúcho: 1995
 Copa Libertadores: 1995

 Figueirense
 Campeonato Catarinense: 2003

Coach
Paulista
Copa do Brasil: 2005

 Vitória
Campeonato Baiano: 2008, 2016

Ceará
Campeonato Cearense: 2011

Chapecoense 
Campeonato Catarinense: 2017

References

External links 
 
 

1966 births
Living people
People from Ribeirão Preto
Brazilian footballers
Brazilian football managers
Brazilian expatriate football managers
Brazilian people of Italian descent
Campeonato Brasileiro Série A players
Campeonato Brasileiro Série A managers
Campeonato Brasileiro Série B players
Campeonato Brasileiro Série B managers
Expatriate football managers in the United Arab Emirates
Association football midfielders
Guarani FC players
Associação Portuguesa de Desportos players
Clube Atlético Bragantino players
Botafogo Futebol Clube (SP) players
Grêmio Foot-Ball Porto Alegrense players
São José Esporte Clube players
Coritiba Foot Ball Club players
Associação Atlética Ponte Preta players
Grêmio Esportivo Sãocarlense players
Ceará Sporting Club players
Figueirense FC players
Sport Club do Recife players
Ituano FC players
Paulista Futebol Clube players
Grêmio Esportivo Sãocarlense managers
Paulista Futebol Clube managers
Al-Nasr SC (Dubai) managers
Grêmio Foot-Ball Porto Alegrense managers
Esporte Clube Vitória managers
Santos FC managers
CR Vasco da Gama managers
Guarani FC managers
Ceará Sporting Club managers
Cruzeiro Esporte Clube managers
Sport Club do Recife managers
Clube Náutico Capibaribe managers
Club Athletico Paranaense managers
Botafogo de Futebol e Regatas managers
Associação Chapecoense de Futebol managers
São Paulo FC managers
Clube Atlético Mineiro managers
Atlético Clube Goianiense managers
Sport Club Corinthians Paulista managers
América Futebol Clube (MG) managers
Footballers from São Paulo (state)